George Amabile (born 29 May 1936)  is a Canadian poet who lives in Winnipeg, Manitoba. His poetry, fiction and non-fiction have been published in Canada, the USA, Europe, South America, Australia and New Zealand in over a hundred anthologies, magazines, journals and periodicals.

He has published seven books. The Presence of Fire won the Canadian Authors' Association Silver Medal for Poetry; his long poem, Dur, placed third in the CBC Literary Competition for 1991; Popular Crime won first prize in the Sidney Booktown International Poetry Contest in February, 2000; and he is the subject of a special issue of Prairie Fire. From October 2000 to April 2001 he was Writer in Residence at the Winnipeg Public library.

Bibliography
1972:Blood Ties 
1976:Open Country 
1977:Flower and Song (in Xochitl, in Cuicatl)  
1981:Ideas of Shelter  
1982:The Presence of Fire  
1995:Rumours of Paradise/Rumours of War  
1996:Five-o'clock Shadows  
2001:Tasting the Dark

See also

Canadian literature
Canadian poetry
List of Canadian poets
List of Canadian writers

References

External links
 Archives of George Amabile (George Amabile fonds, R11693) are held at Library and Archives Canada

1936 births
Living people
Canadian male poets
Writers from Winnipeg
20th-century Canadian poets
20th-century Canadian male writers